Events from the year 1758 in Germany.

Incumbents
 Electorate of Bavaria – Maximilian III Joseph, Elector of Bavaria
 King of Prussia – Frederick the Great
 Electorate of Saxony – Augustus III of Poland
 Electorate of Hanover – George II of Great Britain
 Duchy of Württemberg – Charles Eugene, Duke of Württemberg
 Grand Duke of Baden – Charles Frederick, Grand Duke of Baden

Events 
 15 March – 18 April – Siege of Schweidnitz 
 5 April – Founding of Ludwigsburg porcelain
 4 May – 2 July – Siege of Olomouc
 12 June – Seven Years' War – Battle of Rheinberg
 23 June – Seven Years' War – Battle of Krefeld: Anglo-Hanoverian forces under Ferdinand of Brunswick defeat the French.
 30 June – Seven Years' War – Battle of Domstadtl: Austrian forces under Ernst Gideon von Laudon and Joseph von Siskovits rout an enormous convoy with supplies for the Prussian army, guarded by strong troops of Hans Joachim von Zieten.
 23 July – Battle of Sandershausen
 5 August – Battle of Mehr
 25 August – Seven Years' War – Battle of Zorndorf: Frederick defeats the Russian army of Count Wilhelm Fermor near the Oder.
 26 September – Battle of Tornow
 28 September – Battle of Fehrbellin
 10 October – Seven Years' War – Battle of Lutterberg
 14 October – Seven Years' War: Battle of Hochkirch: Frederick loses a hard-fought battle against the Austrians under Marshal Leopold von Daun, who besieges Dresden.
 18 November – Battle of Güstow
 December 1757 – June 1758 – Blockade of Stralsund

Undated
 Siege of Küstrin
 Construction of the Basilica of St. John the Baptist, Saarbrücken is completed.
 German company MAN is founded.

Births 
 8 April in Mannheim – Peter Joseph Krahe, German architect (died 1840)
 26 June in Schleiz – Christian Gottlieb Reichard, German cartographer (died 1837)
 26 July in Reisbach (Vils) – Maximus von Imhof German physicist (died 1817)
 5 October in Braunschweig – August Lafontaine, German novelist (died 1831)
 22 October in Hanover – Friedrich Rehberg, German portrait and historical painter (died 1835)
 26 October in Dettingen unter Teck – Christian Friedrich von Otto , Württemberger official and politician (died 1836)
 21 November in Schwedt – Duke Eugen of Württemberg (died 1822) 
 11 December - Carl Friedrich Zelter, German composer and conductor (died 1832)
 Undated in Troisdorf – Moritz Kellerhoven German portrait painter and etcher (died 1830)

Deaths 
 16 January in Trier – Oliver Legipont, German Benedictine bibliographer (born 1698)
 10 May in Leipzig – Christian Gottlieb Jöcher, German academic, librarian and lexicographer (born 1694)
 28 May in Weimar – Ernest Augustus II, Duke of Saxe-Weimar-Eisenach (born 1737)
 3 August in Sande, Lower Saxony – Albert Brahms, Frisian dike judge (born 1692)
 3 September in Hanover – George William Alberti, German essayist and theologian, (born 1723)

 
Years of the 18th century in Germany
Germany
Germany